Modern Humorist was a United States-based humor webzine founded in 2000 by John Aboud and Michael Colton (who later became panelists on VH1's Best Week Ever), and managed by CEO Kate Barker. Its board of directors included feature film producer Frank Marshall and comedian Jon Stewart.

A competitor of The Onion, Modern Humorist stopped publishing new material in 2003. The site's archives remain online and free to the public.  It was nominated for a Webby Award in the Humor category in 2001 and in 2004, losing to The Onion both times.

Books
Modern Humorist produced three books:
 (2001) My First Presidentiary
 (2001) Rough Draft: Pop Culture the Way It Almost Was	
 (2002) One Nation, Extra Cheese

Notable contributors
 John Aboud
 Andy Borowitz
 Jake Tapper
 Tim Carvell
 Daniel Chun
 Michael Colton
 Fred Graver
 Kevin Guilfoile
 Francis Heaney
 Gersh Kuntzman
 Seth Mnookin
 Jay Pinkerton
 Nathan Rabin
 Daniel Radosh
 John Warner

References

External links
 Modern Humorist website
 Splitsider interview

Online magazines published in the United States
American comedy websites
Humor magazines
Magazines established in 2000
Magazines disestablished in 2003
Defunct magazines published in the United States